Tanglewood Forest is a neighborhood of southern Austin, Texas that was formerly its own census-designated place in Travis County, active as of the 1990 U.S. Census.

It was formerly governed from a municipal utility district. In 1997 the city of Austin announced it was annexing Tanglewood Forest.

Education

It is in the Austin Independent School District. Kocurek Elementary School is the local elementary.

Headwaters School (formerly Khabele School) Creek Campus is in Tanglewood Forest.

References

External links

 Tanglewood Forest Limited District

Neighborhoods in Austin, Texas
Census-designated places in Travis County, Texas
Former census-designated places in Texas